Parks Bonifay (born September 30, 1981) is an American professional wakeboarder.

Life and career
Bonifay was born in Lake Alfred, Florida. He became a professional wakeboarder in 1994. Parks took the wakeboarding world by storm as a 14-year-old, winning the X-Games in his first visit. He has held many major titles including the Pro Wakeboard Tour titles in 1999 and 2001. His dad put him on skis at just six months, 29 days old.

He became the first documented wakeboarder to land the 1080 (a switch toeside 1080), doing so at a Bill Doster photoshoot in 1999.

Bonifay was a recurring star on MTV's extreme action sports show Nitro Circus. He is sponsored by Ronix, Fox, Red Bull, Spy, MasterCraft, and Performance Ski & Surf.

A full-length feature documentary on Parks' life was released on August 21, 2009, aptly titled The Parks Documentary. It chronicles the story of Park's life, from his roots in water skiing and show skiing via his parents and grandparents, to his exploits, accomplishments and sheer dominance of the world of wakeboarding the past 12 years. 

He resides in Auburndale, Florida.

Filmography

Television

Film

References

External links
 Bio at EXPN.com
 Bio at GravityGames.com
 Bio at USAwaterski.org
 

1981 births
American wakeboarders
Living people
Sportspeople from Pensacola, Florida
Sportspeople from Florida
People from Polk County, Florida